Mario Beccaria, (18 June 1920 – 22 November 2003) was an Italian politician of the Christian Democracy. He served as the mayor of Sant'Angelo Lodigiano from 1960 to 1964 and was a member of the Italian Chamber of Deputies.

He was a lover of music: in the 50s he was part of the Association Amundis, who helped lodigian singers and musicians.

In Sant'Angelo Lodigiano it has been dedicated a street to him.

Notes

External links 
 Parliamentar works of Mario Beccaria

1920 births
2003 deaths
People from the Province of Lodi
Christian Democracy (Italy) politicians
Deputies of Legislature V of Italy
Deputies of Legislature VI of Italy
Politicians of Lombardy